Yissum Research Development Company is the technology transfer company of the Hebrew University of Jerusalem.  Founded in 1964, it is the third tech transfer company in the world to be created, and seeks to convert research  into commercial solutions.

Yissum has founded more than 170 start-up companies, over 100 of which are still active in 2020, registered over 10,750+ patents globally, and licensed over 1050+ technologies. Yissum's business partners include Boston Scientific, Google, ICL, Intel, Johnson & Johnson, Merck, Microsoft, Novartis, GRAIL,  and many more.

Yissum has signed collaboration agreements with Cornell, UCBerkeley, Caltech, Carnegie Mellon University, Children's Medical Center, Columbia University, Harvard University, Johns Hopkins University, MIT, Mayo Clinic, Michigan State University, NYU, Northwestern University, Rockefeller University, Stanford University among other renowned educational institutions.

History
Yissum was founded in 1964 to protect and market the Hebrew University's intellectual property. Since its inception, Yissum has founded more than 170 start-up companies, over 100 of which are still active in 2020, registered over 10,750+ patents globally, and licensed over 1050+ technologies. Yissum's business partners span the globe and include companies such as Boston Scientific, Google, ICL, Intel, Johnson & Johnson, Merck, Microsoft, Novartis, Teva GRAIL, and many more.

Yissum has signed collaboration agreements with Cornell, UCBerkeley, Caltech, Carnegie Mellon University, Children's Medical Center, Columbia University, Harvard University, Johns Hopkins University, MIT, Mayo Clinic, Michigan State University, NYU, Northwestern University, Rockefeller University, Stanford University among other renowned educational institutions.

In Israel, technology transfer entities are organized as companies, unlike the United States. In the United States technology transfer operations only began after the Bayh–Dole Act in 1982. Yissum is a for-profit company which is fully owned by the Hebrew University which is a not-for-profit entity. This makes Yissum a non-typical entity.

Yissum founded Integra Holdings in 2012.

In 2014, QLight Nanotech, a subsidiary of Yissum partly owned by Merck, opened an R&D facility in Jerusalem for developing advanced LED lighting and displaypanels.

Yissum founded Agrinnovation in 2015.

Start-up companies
QLight Nanotech - A subsidiary of Yissum, is a start up partly owned by Merck KGaA. In 2013, QLight opened a new facility in Jerusalem.
MobilEye
 BriefCam (Video Synopsis)
 HumanEyes
OrCam
Ex Libris Group

Active Start-Ups

Products brought to market by Yissum
 Exelon - A cholinesterase inhibitor, a type of medicine prescribed for people in the early or middle stages of Alzheimer's disease. Invented by Marta Weinstock-Rosin. 
 Doxil - additional information can be found also at Doxorubicin - For the treatment of patients with ovarian cancer. Invented by Yechezkal Barenholz and Alberto Gabizon. 
 PerioChip - For reduction of pocket depth in patients with chronic periodontitis. Invented by Michael Friedman, Michael Sela and Doron Steinberg
 Cherry tomatoes and long shelf life tomatoes - Invented by Haim Rabinowitch and Nachum Kedar.
 Hybrid peppers - Invented by Yonatan Elkind.
 LO2 Eye Drops - Invented by Shabtay Dikstein
 Cationorm - For relief to patients suffering from dry eye symptoms. Invented by Simon Benita.
 UV-Pearl Technology - Invented by David Avnir

See also
Start-up Nation
Israel Technology Transfer Organization

References

Economy of Israel
Universities in Israel
Research and development in Israel
Hebrew University of Jerusalem
Economy of Jerusalem
Technology transfer